Henry Smith (1705-1765) was an 18th-century Irish Anglican priest.

Smith was born in County Limerick and educated at Trinity College, Dublin. He was  Archdeacon of Glendalough from 1760 to 1764.

Notes

18th-century Irish Anglican priests
Archdeacons of Glendalough
Alumni of Trinity College Dublin
Clergy from County Limerick
1705 births
1765 deaths